John Jensen (born 3 May 1965), nicknamed Faxe, is a Danish football manager and former player.

A former midfielder, his playing career lasted almost two entire decades, including a stint with Arsenal in England and three stints with Brøndby IF in Denmark. He scored four goals in 69 caps for the Denmark national team, entering Danish footballing folklore during the 1992 European Championship tournament, when he scored the opening goal in Denmark's 2–0 victory over Germany in the final.

Club career

Early career
Jensen started his career at Brøndby IF, and was an important part of the team which won several Danish championships in the late 1980s, crowned by a call-up to the Denmark national team and the Danish Player of the Year award in 1987. Following a short stay with Bundesliga team Hamburger SV in 1988, he was back with Brøndby in 1990 where he took part in the club's successful 1991 UEFA Cup campaign which reached the semi-final of the tournament.

Arsenal
After scoring in Denmark's 2–0 1992 European Championship final win over Germany, Jensen was signed by George Graham for Arsenal to succeed Leeds United bound David Rocastle in central midfield, after a bid to sign Geoff Thomas from Crystal Palace failed.

He was part of the 1992–93 side that won the FA Cup, the 1993–94 side that won the European Cup Winners Cup (although he missed the final through injury) and the 1994–95 side that lost in the Cup-Winners Cup final. He was one of only 12 foreign players to play on the opening weekend of the FA Premier League.

He scored his first goal for Arsenal on his 98th appearance, against Queens Park Rangers on 31 December 1994. Having scored in the 1992 European Championship final, but never scoring for Arsenal, every time he was within long range of the goal the Arsenal fans would ironically shout "shooot".

A few months later, it was revealed that Jensen's transfer to Highbury was at least partly motivated by George Graham's involvement with agent Rune Hauge, who had been giving Graham backhanders in exchange for signing players he represented. The first player involved in this 'bung' scandal was Norwegian defender Pål Lydersen, and the second was Jensen. Graham was sacked from his job two months after the story broke, and he was subsequently banned from football for 12 months. For his part in the scandal Hauge was banned from operating as a football agent for life but that was later reduced to two years on appeal.

Jensen played on for 18 months before he left Highbury in the summer of 1996, with one goal from 138 competitive appearances for the club. Officially, though, he also scored a shootout goal against his friend Peter Schmeichel of Manchester United in the 1993 FA Charity Shield.

Return to Denmark
After leaving Arsenal he rejoined his old club, Brøndby IF. In 1999, he moved on to Herfølge, where he was part of the squad that won the 1999–2000 Danish Superliga.

International career
Jensen scored four goals in 69 appearances for the Denmark national team between 1987 and 1995. He appeared at Euro 1992, and is noted for scoring the first goal in the Final of an eventual 2–0 victory against Germany.

During the years he spent at Arsenal, Jensen scored two goals in 21 games for the Denmark national team: one against Albania in 1993 and one against Belgium in 1994.

Coaching career
Jensen retired from full-time playing in 1999 and accepted the job of player/manager at Herfølge BK, a small Danish club, and immediately made a name for himself by winning the Danish Superliga on his first attempt. However, Herfølge's success was short-lived, and they were relegated from the Superliga in the 2001 season. Jensen's reputation with his old club was good enough to secure him a move back to Brøndby IF, as assistant manager to Michael Laudrup, a position he held until June 2006, when Jensen and Laudrup did not extend their contracts with the club.

When Laudrup in 2007 was named new manager at Spanish side Getafe, Jensen followed him as assistant manager. Laudrup quit Getafe after only one season, taking Jensen with him. On 12 January 2009, Jensen started as manager of Danish Superliga side Randers FC. On 6 October 2009, Jensen was sacked from Randers FC after a series of nine losses and two draws in 11 matches.

On 12 January 2011, he signed a six-month contract with Blackburn Rovers to become assistant manager and work alongside Steve Kean. On 23 May 2011, he signed a new deal one-year deal to remain as Steve Kean's assistant at Blackburn.

On 29 September 2011, he left Blackburn Rovers.

On 11 October 2012, he was appointed consultant for Brøndby IF by manager Auri Skarbalius.

On 27 May 2014, he was named new manager of Danish club Fremad Amager replacing Tim Ilsø.

In September 2018, it was announced that Jensen would take temporary charge of the Denmark national team for their replacement team's friendly match against Slovakia, following a dispute between the Danish Football Union and players, which also involved incumbent head coach Åge Hareide. "When I say yes to help it's because I feel very strongly for the national team as an institution, and because the most important thing must be that the games will be played after all", said Jensen.

Career statistics

Club

International
Scores and results list Denmark's goal tally first, score column indicates score after each Jensen goal.

Honours

Player
Brøndby
 Danish Superliga: 1987, 1988, 1990, 1991, 1995–96, 1996–97,1997–98

Arsenal
 FA Cup: 1992–93
 League Cup: 1992–93
 European Cup Winners' Cup: 1993–94; runner-up: 1994–95
 European Super Cup runner-up: 1994

Herfølge BK
 Danish Superliga: 1999–2000

Denmark
 European Championship: 1992

Individual
 Danish Player of the Year: 1987

Manager
Herfølge BK
 Danish Superliga: 1999–2000

Individual
 Danish Coach of the Year: 2000

References

External links
 
 Brøndby IF manager profile 
 Brøndby IF 1996–1999 player statistics 
 
 
 

1965 births
Living people
Footballers from Copenhagen
Danish men's footballers
Association football midfielders
Brøndby IF players
Hamburger SV players
Arsenal F.C. players
Herfølge Boldklub players
Danish Superliga players
Bundesliga players
Premier League players
Denmark under-21 international footballers
Denmark international footballers
UEFA Euro 1988 players
UEFA Euro 1992 players
UEFA European Championship-winning players
Danish expatriate men's footballers
Danish expatriate sportspeople in Germany
Danish expatriate sportspeople in England
Expatriate footballers in Germany
Expatriate footballers in England
Danish football managers
Herfølge Boldklub managers
Getafe CF non-playing staff
Blackburn Rovers F.C. non-playing staff
Randers FC managers
Denmark national football team managers
Fremad Amager managers
Danish Superliga managers
Danish expatriate sportspeople in Spain
Brøndby IF non-playing staff
FA Cup Final players
Danish 1st Division managers